Biotechnology Advances is a peer-reviewed scientific journal which focuses on the biotechnology principles and industry applications of research in agriculture, medicine, and the environment.

Abstracting and indexing 
The journal is abstracted and indexed in BIOSIS Previews, CAB Abstracts, Chemical Abstracts, Current Contents/Agriculture, Biology & Environmental Sciences, EMBASE, Science Citation Index, and Scopus. According to the Journal Citation Reports, the journal has a 2020 impact factor of 14.227 .

References

External links 
 

Elsevier academic journals
Biotechnology journals
Biweekly journals
English-language journals
Publications established in 1984